Lo-Fi B-Sides is the second EP released by Canadian rock group Matthew Good Band. The EP was limited to 5000 copies and was included as a bonus with purchase of the band's 1997 album Underdogs. Because of the EP's rarity, Good opted to include the tracks in the deluxe edition of In a Coma.

Track listing
"Born to Kill" [demo] (Matthew Good, Dave Genn) – 5:15
"Enjoy the Silence" (Martin Gore) – 3:12
"Fated" (Good) – 3:32

Miscellanea
 All of the tracks from this release were yielded from early demo sessions for the 1999 album Beautiful Midnight.
 "Enjoy the Silence" is a cover of the Depeche Mode song from their 1990 album, Violator. It was also the only recorded cover song ever released by the Matthew Good Band.

Matthew Good albums
1998 EPs
1998 compilation albums